Mustafa Mohamed Ismail, better known by his stage name Freek, is a UAE-based Somali rapper, singer, music director and record producer who is noted as one of the artists in the conception of Arabic drill rap music genre and GCC's underground music scene.

Personal life
Freek was born and raised in Abu Dhabi to Somali parents who migrated to the UAE in the 1970s.

Career
Freek's career as a musician began with Alonzo’s track titled Batali released in 2014 and his first single Aslan 3adi was released in 2015. His single Wala Kilma got him noticed for penning the 2019 Adidas marketing song featuring Mohamed Salah. Wala Kilma which was listed on Link Up TV became popular in the United Kingdom, a major cultural centre for the Somali diaspora, and was remixed with British rappers Eyez and Young Tribez. The song also landed the Freek his debut tour in London and Leicester in December 2019, as well as paved him the way for a series of performances in shows in the UAE including Sole DXB, Abu Dhabi Grand Prix and Expo 2020 where his performances were collaborated with Future, Gucci Mane and the Wu-Tang Clan.

In 2020 Freek's music career was reviewed in a journal article by Mona Kareem where he was lablled as one of the first Gulf rappers to have taken the trap music genre to the hit‑making level, expanding Arabic hip hop beyond conscious rap and YouTube niche. In 2021 he was featured on the Charlie Sloth’s Fire in The Booth (Dubai Series) and on the Virgin Radio Dubai’s Regional Artist Spotlight in 2022. In the same year Freek's first studio-recorded album titled "150", comprising eight tracks, was released.

Discography

Singles

 2015 Aslan 3Adi
 2019 Wala Kilma
 2019 Wala Kilma Remix (ft. Young Tribez & Eyez)
 2019 Wadha
 2019 La Titfalsaf
 2020 Shwaya (Freek & Don Fuego)
 2020 Mush Fathi
 2020 Khali Wali
 2020 Team (ft. Ab)
 2021 Khfi

Albums

"150" (2022)

 Floos (ft. The Synaptic)
 La Tithawar (ft. Lil Eazy)
 Doos
 Sah Wala La (ft. TooDope)
 Mia Mia
 Samehni
 Kathab
 Min That (ft. Alyoungofficial & Randarofficial)

Collaborations

 2014 Batali (Alonzo ft. Freek)
 2022 Lali (The Synaptic, Freek & EQuBE)
 2021 Nas Ghareeba (Oman Dafencii, Khayyat ft. Freek)

References

External links
Voices of Dubai: Freek, (Dubai Culture & Arts Authority)

Living people
1990 births
Emirati male singers
Emirati rappers